Vasudevan is a given name and surname. Notable people with the name are:

Given name:
Vasudevan Baskaran, former field hockey player from India
Gobichettypalayam Vasudevan Loganathan (1954–2007), Indian-born American professor at Virginia Tech, United States
M. T. Vasudevan Nair (born 1933), known as MT, Indian author, screenplay writer and film director
Madavoor Vasudevan Nair, veteran Kathakali artiste, recipient of the Padma Bhushan award from the government of India
P. K. Vasudevan Nair (1926–2005), known as PKV, the 9th Chief Minister of Kerala and a senior leader of the Communist Party of India (CPI)
Nelliyode Vasudevan Namboodiri, Kathakali artiste noted for chuvanna thaadi (red beard) roles in classical Kerala dance-drama
Kadammanitta Vasudevan Pillai, Padayani exponent from Kerala, India
Vayala Vasudevan Pillai (1945–2011), Malayalam-language playwright from Kerala
AV Vasudevan Potti (born 1951), lyricist in both the Malayalam film industry and Hindu devotional song industry
Vasudevan Srinivas (born 1958), Indian mathematician who specialises in algebraic geometry

Surname:
Ash Vasudevan, the Founding Managing Partner of Edge Holdings, LLC
Damodaran M. Vasudevan, the Dean of the College of Medicine at Amrita Vishwa Vidyapeetham, Kochi, India
Malaysia Vasudevan (1944–2011), Tamil playback singer and actor in the Tamil film industry
Meera Vasudevan (born 1982), Indian film actress and model
Neyyattinkara Vasudevan (1940–2008), Carnatic music vocalist from Kerala in south India
S. Vasudevan (born 1955), former captain of Tamil Nadu cricket team
Shakthi Vasudevan (born 1983), Tamil film actor
Srinivasan Vasudevan (born 1962), retired Indian professional tennis player
Sujith Vasudevan, better known as Sharreth, music director and singer
T. E. Vasudevan, Indian film producer, mainly in Malayalam

See also
Vasudeva

Indian masculine given names